= Wife of Ronald Reagan =

Wife of Ronald Reagan may refer to:

- Jane Wyman (1917–2007), American actress
- Nancy Reagan (1921–2016), First Lady of the United States from 1981 to 1989
